These are the 9 castelli (municipalities) of San Marino:   

Though it is one of the biggest towns of the Republic, Dogana is not an autonomous castello but belongs to the castello of Serravalle. Like Italian comuni, the castelli of San Marino include a main town that is the seat of the castello, called the capoluogo, and other settlements known as frazioni or curazie.

See also
ISO 3166-2:SM

 
Municipalities
San Marino, Municipalities
San Marino 1
Municipalities, San Marino
San Marino
Cities